Coptopterella scutellata is a species of beetle in the family Carabidae, the only species in the genus Coptopterella.

References

Lebiinae